Cloud9 is a mobile network operator focussed on providing mobile subscriptions over the air to programmable SIM cards, SoftSIMs and eSIMs. Their service is used in both smartphones and IoT devices.

Background
Cloud9, originally owned by Wire9 Telecom Plc, funded and established by investor and telecom specialist, Lee Jones, before being sold for an undisclosed sum by Jones to billionaire Romain Zaleski. It established in the UK, Gibraltar, and Isle of Man as a domestic Mobile Network Operator. Cloud9 obtained spectrum licenses in the Isle of Man in 2007 and Gibraltar in 2010. Around 2011, Cloud9 decided to focus on supplying global SIM cards to save roaming charges.  The Gibraltar spectrum licence was sold to another company. The business relocated its core network to Telehouse in London and became a subsidiary of BlueMango Technologies Ltd. Later the company was acquired by Wireless Logic Ltd.

The company is privately held with headquarters in the United Kingdom.

Cloud9 have shipped several million 'Travel SIMs'. They do not supply end users instead preferring to offer a white label service to travel and telecoms resellers. All SIM cards have been branded with the logo of these resellers.

In addition the company now provides the digital signatures ( 'profiles' or 'IMSIs' ) that provide a SIM card with the ability to register with a network and function. These can be provisioned over the air to dynamic SIM cards such as programmable removable UICCs, SoftSIMs and eSIMs. They are members of the GSM Association and are involved in the GSMA remote SIM provisioning standard for eSIMs that will be released soon.

Remotely provisioned SIMs are gaining traction with smartphone manufacturers (SoftSIMs) and IoT devices (eSIMs).

Cloud9 continue to sell SIMs for travellers on a white label basis in addition to the above.

Its Mobile Country Code is 234 and its Mobile Network Code is 18. TADIG code is GBRC9.

The company has been allocated the following UK number ranges by Ofcom:

4478722, 4477000, 4474409, 4479782, 4479783 and 4475588

In 2013 they acquired the IPR of a UK manufacturer of core networks, Zynetix Ltd. This means that they now possess all of their own IPR with regards to their core network (HLR/SMSC/GGSN/GMSC etc.).  and supply core network components to other companies. Through this they have achieved sales as an MVNE. The Cloud9 core network additionally supports 4G (HSS/PDG).

The core network is hosted on Cloud9 servers at Telehouse near Canary Wharf in London. Additional components are hosted in Amazon Web Services facilities around the world in order to minimise latency and provide scalability.

The company has been voted as a Red Herring Top 100 Europe finalist.

References

Wireless carriers
Wireless
Telecommunications